Jackson Cameron Ragen (born September 24, 1998) is an American professional soccer player who plays as a defender for Seattle Sounders FC of Major League Soccer.

Career
Ragen began his youth career with Seattle United from 2008 to 2016 before joining the Seattle Sounders FC Academy for one year.  On February 3, 2017, it was announced that Ragen signed to play college soccer at the University of Michigan.  He made his debut for USL club Seattle Sounders FC 2 in a goalless draw against San Antonio FC.  Despite making three appearances for S2, he was still eligible to play in college.

On August 28, 2017, Ragen made his collegiate debut for the Wolverines in a 1–1 draw against Valparaiso.  On September 24, he scored his first collegiate goal in a 3–1 victory over Northwestern.

In 2019, Ragen appeared for National Premier Soccer League side OSA FC.

He was drafted in the second round of the 2021 MLS SuperDraft by Chicago Fire FC. Regan opted to remain at college to play out his senior season, which was delayed due to the COVID-19 pandemic.

On April 9, 2021, Ragen was named the Big Ten Conference Men's Soccer Defensive Player of the Year for the 2020 season.

On August 8, 2021, Ragen signed a deal with USL Championship side Tacoma Defiance.

On February 14, 2022, Seattle Sounders FC acquired Ragen's MLS rights from Chicago Fire in exchange for a 3rd round 2023 MLS SuperDraft pick, and signed him to their roster.

Career statistics

Honors
Seattle Sounders FC
CONCACAF Champions League: 2022

References

External links

University of Michigan bio
U.S. Soccer Development Academy bio

1998 births
Living people
American soccer players
Michigan Wolverines men's soccer players
Tacoma Defiance players
Association football defenders
Soccer players from Seattle
USL Championship players
National Premier Soccer League players
Chicago Fire FC draft picks
Seattle Sounders FC players
Major League Soccer players